Flight Lieutenant John William Morrison, 2nd Viscount Dunrossil  (22 May 1926 – 22 March 2000) was a British diplomat.  Lord Dunrossil was British High Commissioner to Fiji, Nauru and Tuvalu and later to Barbados. His career reached its peak when he was appointed Governor and Commander-in-Chief of Bermuda in 1983.  While in South Africa he supported Nelson Mandela during his imprisonment by helping him gain a law degree from the University of London.

Early life and education
Morrison was educated at Fettes College in Edinburgh before serving in the RAF between 1945 and 1948 and reaching the rank of Flight Lieutenant. Between 1948 and 1950 he read History at Oriel College, Oxford; his course being shorter than the usual three years due to the Second World War. He became President of the Conservative Association during his time at Oxford.

Career
The early years of Morrison's diplomatic career were wide-ranging, including as Assistant Private Secretary to The Viscount Swinton and as First Secretary in Dacca, East Pakistan (now Bangladesh). His career would go on to focus mainly on the Commonwealth countries. In February 1961, he inherited the viscountcy of Dunrossil from his father, William Morrison, 1st Viscount Dunrossil, who died in office as the Governor-General of Australia.

Dunrossil was posted to South Africa, and was present during the trial of Nelson Mandela and his sentencing to 27 years' imprisonment.  He subsequently obtained study materials for Mandela in order that he might achieve a law degree from the University of London.

His career reached its peak from 1978 onwards when he was appointed High Commissioner to Fiji, Nauru and Tuvalu. He then became High Commissioner to Barbados and the Eastern Caribbean in 1982 before being appointed Governor and Commander-in-Chief of Bermuda in 1983. His time in Bermuda was very successful mainly, as John Ure argues, due to his "genial temperament" and "social standing" meaning that he was able to settle the troubles of the region that had preceded his appointment. Lord Dunrossil was appointed a Commander of the Order of St Michael and St George (CMG) in 1981 for his diplomatic service.

After Bermuda
Upon retirement in 1988, Lord Dunrossil took on several directorships and also played an active part as a cross-bench peer in the House of Lords. He left the House in 1999 as he was not one of the elected hereditary peers allowed to remain in the Lords. Lord Dunrossil therefore devoted himself to spending time at Dunrossil House, his ancestral home in the Outer Hebrides, becoming a Justice of the Peace (JP). He was appointed Lord Lieutenant of the Western Isles in 1993, holding this post until his death in Lanzarote in 2000.

Personal life
Lord Dunrossil married twice, firstly to Mavis Dawn Spencer-Payne on 3 July 1951. The couple had three sons and one daughter, including his heir, Andrew William Reginald Morrison, who was born in 1953. Mavis, Viscountess Dunrossil, is a governor of the Cotswold School.

He divorced his first wife in 1969 and remarried the same year to Diana Mary Cunliffe Vise who became Viscountess Dunrossil upon their marriage. The couple had two children.

Arms

References

External links

1926 births
2000 deaths
Alumni of Oriel College, Oxford
Companions of the Order of St Michael and St George
Governors of Bermuda
Scottish justices of the peace
Lord-Lieutenants of the Western Isles
People educated at Fettes College
People from Uist
Scottish diplomats
Viscounts in the Peerage of the United Kingdom
High Commissioners of the United Kingdom to Barbados
High Commissioners of the United Kingdom to Fiji
High Commissioners of the United Kingdom to Nauru
High Commissioners of the United Kingdom to Tuvalu
Dunrossil